Aes rude  (Latin, "rough bronze") was a nugget of bronze used as a sort of proto-currency in ancient Italy prior to the use of minted coins made from precious metals.

The Italian economy of the time (late middle first millennium BC) was based on a bronze standard (unlike the silver standards in use in contemporary Greece, the Aeginetan standard and its competitor the Attic standard).  Consequently, unworked lumps of bronze were used as both primitive ingots and as primitive coins, facilitating trade across the peninsula and paving the way for the first true Roman ingots, the aes signatum, which, in turn, was the precursor of the first Roman true coinage, the aes grave.

The earliest surviving piece of aes rude dates from the early 8th century BC and as late as the late 4th century BC, and was cast in central Italy.  It is, simply, bronze, shaped vaguely like a lumpy ingot.  Only later on did it become usual to mark these lumps and, eventually, make them into a standard shape (the round, thin disk-shape still in use today).

See also
Roman Republican coinage

References

Sources
https://web.archive.org/web/20051228143453/http://dougsmith.ancients.info/feac56cas.html
Lloyd, J. (trans.), Orrieux, C. & Schmitt Pantel, P., A History of Ancient Greece, Oxford, 1999, Blackwell Publishers, Ltd.
 Haeberlin E.: Aes Grave, Das Schwergeld Roms und Mittelitaliens einschließlich der ihm vorausgehenden Rohbronzewährung, Halle 1910
  Sydenham, Edward A.: Aes Grave A Study of the Cast Coinages of Rome and Central Italy. London, Spink, 1926
 Head Barclay V. Historia Nummorum, a Manual of Greek Numismatic, London, 1911
 Gaius Plinius Secundus (Pliny the Elder): Naturalis Historia, XXXIII, XIII, 43 (antea rudi usos Romae Timaeus tradit).
 Italo Vecchi. Italian Cast Coinage. A descriptive catalogue of the cast coinage of Rome and Italy. London Ancient Coins, London 2013. Hard bound in quarto format, 84 pages, 92 plates.  
Hard bound in quarto format,72 pages, 87 plates. 
A new edition of Italian Cast Coinage (ICC) compiled by Italo Vecchi which summarises the research into Italy's cast bronze coinage since 1885. It lists 327 types from the aes rude and currency bars of early 1st millennium Italy to the final issues during the Second Punic War, many of which are previously unpublished. The book also includes an account of the cast coinages of Rome, Etruria, Umbria, North-East and Central Italy, Lucania and Apulia. Arranged overall by geographical area, the mints within each area are then listed alphabetically; included are details of the historical or geographical background, and an examination of the weight standards and chronology as well as three maps of the area. At the end of the book there are 87 plates illustrating almost all the types in the catalogue. The book is fully indexed for ease of reference.

Coins of ancient Rome

fr:As (monnaie)#Aes rude